Canberra Technology Park is located in Watson, Canberra. It is set on 57,835.2 square metres and is a renovated two level high school. It houses approximately 32 businesses with approximately 200 staff working from the park.

References

Geography of the Australian Capital Territory